Douglas A. Hicks is president of Davidson College and a religion and economics scholar.

Hicks became the 19th president of Davidson College on August 1, 2022. He previously served as Dean of Oxford College of Emory University and the Charles R. Kenan, Jr. Professor of Religion at Emory. Before that, he was Professor of Religion and Senior Advisor for Academic Initiatives at Colgate University in Hamilton NY. (see http://www.colgate.edu/douglas-hicks ). He served as Colgate's Provost and Dean of the Faculty from 2012 through 2015.  From 1998 through 2012, Hicks was Professor of Leadership Studies and Religion at the 
Jepson School of Leadership Studies at the University of Richmond. He was the founding leader for the Bonner Center for Civic Engagement at the University of Richmond. He served for five years as director and then executive director before returning to the classroom full-time in 2009. Hicks was also president of the Academy of Religious Leadership and served as co-chair of the American Academy of Religion's section on religion and the social sciences. He is a former president of the Richmond Association of Phi Beta Kappa and was a board member of the Virginia Poverty Law Center.  In 2012 he received the State Council of Higher Education of Virginia's Outstanding Faculty Award.

An ordained minister in the Presbyterian Church (USA), Hicks holds an A.B. degree with honors in economics from Davidson College, an M.Div. degree, summa cum laude, from Duke University, and M.A. and Ph.D. degrees in religion, ethics and economics from Harvard University. During the spring of 2003, he served as visiting assistant professor of religion and society at Harvard Divinity School.

He is the author of four books: Inequality and Christian Ethics (2000), Religion and the Workplace (2003), With God on All Sides: Leadership in a Devout and Diverse America (2009), and Money Enough: Everyday Practices for Living Faithfully in the Global Economy (2010).

His articles have appeared in The Leadership Quarterly, The Journal of Religious Ethics, World Development and The Journal of Ecumenical Studies.

Works

Books

References

External links
 Official Website
 The Pluralism Project, Harvard University 
 International Leadership Association
 

Harvard University faculty
University of Richmond faculty
Davidson College alumni
Duke University alumni
Harvard University alumni
American theologians
Christian ethicists
American Presbyterians
Living people
Year of birth missing (living people)